Mayor of the Sunset Strip is a 2003 documentary film on the life of Rodney Bingenheimer directed by George Hickenlooper, and produced by Chris Carter.

Background
In 2011, Craig Hlavaty of the Houston Press named Mayor of the Sunset Strip at number eight on the paper's list of "The 31 Best Music Documentaries of All Time". The film won the Best Documentary Feature at the 2004 Santa Barbara International Film Festival.

References

External links
 
 

2003 films
2003 documentary films
Documentary films about the music industry
American documentary films
Films directed by George Hickenlooper
Films scored by Anthony Marinelli
2000s English-language films
2000s American films